Jeff Hazuga was a player in the National Football League playing 3 games for the Minnesota Vikings in 2001 as a defensive end. He played at the collegiate level at St. Cloud State University and the University of Wisconsin–Stout.

Biography
Hazuga was born on April 29, 1978, in Thorp, Wisconsin.

References

Minnesota Vikings players
St. Cloud State Huskies football players
Wisconsin–Stout Blue Devils football players
People from Thorp, Wisconsin
Players of American football from Wisconsin
1978 births
Living people